The 1971 Tour de France was the 58th edition of the Tour de France, one of cycling's Grand Tours. The Tour began in Mulhouse with a prologue team time trial on 26 June, and Stage 9 occurred on 6 July with a mountainous stage to Saint-Étienne. The race finished in Paris on 18 July.

Prologue
26 June 1971 - Mulhouse to Mulhouse,  (TTT)

Stage 1a
27 June 1971 - Mulhouse to Basel,

Stage 1b
27 June 1971 - Basel to Freiburg,

Stage 1c
27 June 1971 - Freiburg to Mulhouse,

Stage 2
28 June 1971 - Mulhouse to Strasbourg,

Stage 3
29 June 1971 - Strasbourg to Nancy,

Stage 4
30 June 1971 - Nancy to Marche-en-Famenne,

Stage 5
1 July 1971 - Dinant to Roubaix,

Stage 6a
2 July 1971 - Roubaix to Amiens,

Stage 6b
2 July 1971 - Amiens to Le Touquet,

Rest day 1
3 July 1971 - Le Touquet

Stage 7
4 July 1971 - Rungis to Nevers,

Stage 8
5 July 1971 - Nevers to Puy de Dôme,

Stage 9
6 July 1971 - Clermont-Ferrand to Saint-Étienne,

References

1971 Tour de France
Tour de France stages